Galila Tamarhan (or Tamruhan) al-Habashiya ( / ALA-LC: Jalīlah Tamarhān; d. 1863) was a medical practitioner in 19th century Ottoman Egypt. She was one of the earliest women to sign her articles in the Arab press, by contributing "articles to a medical magazine called Yaasoub el-Tib (Leader in Medicine) in the 1860s". After completing her studies in 1847 at the nursing school of Abu Zaabal, she was appointed by the latter as an assistant schoolmistress, and was promoted in 1857 to the position of chief instructor, which she held until her death.

References

Sources

1863 deaths
Egyptian women physicians
19th-century physicians from the Ottoman Empire
Year of birth unknown
19th-century Egyptian women writers
19th-century Egyptian writers
19th-century Egyptian physicians
19th-century women physicians